The 76th Scripps National Spelling Bee was held on May 28–29, 2003, in Washington D.C.

Winners
The competition was won by 13-year-old eighth grader Sai R. Gunturi of Dallas, sponsored by the Dallas Morning News, who correctly spelled rhathymia followed by pococurante for the win. He had happened to have studied the final word previously, so knew he was going to win. He won $12,000 as well as additional prizes. It was Gunturi's fourth trip to the bee, improving his performance every year. He was tied for 32nd in 2000, and placed 16th in 2001 and 7th in 2002; his sister Nivedita tied for 8th place in 1997.

Second place went to 14-year-old homeschooled student Evelyn Blacklock of Tuxedo Park, New York, who misspelled gnathonic. She had also competed in the prior year, finishing 59th.

Third place was a three-way tie among three contestants who fell in round 11. JJ Goldstein, age 13 of Great Neck, New York, fell when misspelling betony. Samir Patel, age 9, of Colleyville, Texas, misspelled boudin. Patel tied for second-place two years later in the 2005 bee. And Trudy McLeary, age 14 of Kingston, Jamaica fell on aplustre. This was the best performance by an entrant from Jamaica since winning the 1998 bee.

Competition

251 contestants participated between the ages of 9 and 15, with most being age 13 and in eighth grade. The field included 167 which attended public schools, and 19 with a sibling with prior bee experience. The competition lasted 15 rounds, and started on May 28, 2003 with an oral round that excluded 76 contestants, followed by a 25 word written test which eliminated 91 more spellers who made errors on more than 10 words. The next year the written test, first introduced the prior year, was given before the oral round because spellers had reported being too anxious to do a written test after the opening oral round. Eighty-four contestants returned for the final competition at 8 a.m. of the next day. The competition by 2:15 p.m. was reduced to 30. The final rounds were aired on ESPN and ESPN2.

This was the first year in which Jacques Bailly became chief pronouncer, replacing the recently deceased Alex Cameron who had served in that role for over 20 years.

References

Scripps National Spelling Bee competitions
2003 in Washington, D.C.
2003 in education
May 2003 events in the United States